Nick Jr. in Israel was launched as a programming block in 2003. On 7 February 2012, it became a channel.

References

Israel
Television channels in Israel
Television channels and stations established in 2012
Children's television networks